Anystoidea is a superfamily of mites in the order Trombidiformes.

References

Further reading

 
 
 

Trombidiformes